Pskovsky (masculine), Pskovskaya (feminine), or Pskovskoye (neuter) may refer to:
Pskovsky District, a district of Pskov Oblast, Russia
Pskovsky (rural locality) (Pskovskaya, Pskovskoye), name of several rural localities in Russia
Pskov Oblast (Pskovskaya oblast), a federal subject of Russia
Ayke (village), Kazakhstan